Aplysioidea is a superfamily of predatory sea snails, marine gastropod mollusks within the clade Anaspidea.

Aplysiidae is the only family in this superfamily.

References

 Taxonomy of the Gastropoda (Bouchet & Rocroi, 2005)

Anaspidea